Domingos das Neves (born unknown - deceased) was a Portuguese footballer who played as a forward.

External links 
 
 

Portuguese footballers
Association football forwards
S.C. Olhanense players
Portugal international footballers
Year of birth missing
Place of birth missing
Year of death missing